Oriyon (Russian and Tajik: Ориён, formerly: Avangard) is a jamoat in Tajikistan. It is located in Kushoniyon District in Khatlon Region. The jamoat has a total population of 10,392 (2015).

Notes

References

Populated places in Khatlon Region
Jamoats of Tajikistan